Adèle Castillon du Perron is a French singer and actress. She was the singer in the French pop duo Videoclub from 2018 until 2021, and has since gone solo. As an actress, she appeared in the French comedy film Sous le même toit (2017), French thriller School's Out (2018)

Early life and career 
Castillon was born in Angers, France, to Benoît Castillon du Perron and Anne-Pascale Crèvecœur. She has two siblings. As a child, Castillon started making YouTube videos and had theatre training, though she did not consider that these two correlated with each other and did not intend to use YouTube for her career prospects. At the age of 15, with actress Léa Seydoux and some friends, she interviewed the Dalai Lama in Dharamshala, India.

In 2018, Castillon met Matthieu Reynaud and formed Videoclub, over their shared love of 80s nostalgia. Their channel had amassed over 20,000 subscribers before posting anything (to the suspicion of YouTube offices) due to her popularity on the site and their music quickly went viral there, on TikTok, and on Spotify.

In May 2021, before the release of their album Euphories, Videoclub announced the disbandment of the group and that they would each be pursuing solo projects.

On the 10th of June 2022 she released "Impala" her first song released after splitting from Videoclub.

References 

Living people
2001 births
French women singers
French child actresses
People from Angers